The Gramos Incident was an attack by the Greek army on Albania in 1950, with the aim of capturing the mountains of Gramos.

Incident 
On May 24, 1950, a Greek battalion, reinforced with artillery, tried to take the top of Gramos. Only 50 Albanian soldiers were involved in this incident and they were lightly armed.The Greek army pushed 150 meters into Albanian territory. After a few hours of battle, the Greek forces retreated, leaving 6 dead and 7 wounded.

References

External links 

 ne kurriz te shqiperise
Battles involving Albania